Katrina Jane Sharples is a New Zealand biostatistician. She is full professor in the Department of Mathematics and Statistics at the University of Otago, and head of statistics at Otago.

Sharples completed a Ph.D. in statistics at the University of Washington in 1989. Her dissertation, Regression Analysis of Correlated Binary Data, was supervised by Norman Breslow.

Her research has included work on cattle-based spreading of leptospirosis in Tanzania, and a study of tuberculosis in Indonesia.

Sharples is also a viola player in the Dunedin Symphony Orchestra, and has performed in smaller string ensembles in Dunedin.

References

External links

Year of birth missing (living people)
Living people
New Zealand statisticians
Women statisticians
Biostatisticians
University of Washington alumni
Academic staff of the University of Otago
New Zealand classical violists
Women violists